Adam Black (born 24 May 1975 in Barking, England) is a rugby union player. A prop forward, Black has represented England at Under 21 level.

He played for London Wasps, Bedford, Sale Sharks, Ebbw Vale and Newport Gwent Dragons before joining Worcester Warriors in May 2009.  Since retiring he has become a coach.  He is currently head coach at Bude. He is also the co owner of East Thorne Cornwall alongside Naomi Black.He was also a contestant on 4 In A Bed

References

External links
Newport Gwent Dragons profile
Worcester Warriors profile

1975 births
Living people
Dragons RFC players
English rugby union players
Rugby union players from Romford
Worcester Warriors players
Rugby union props